The seventeenth edition of the Johan Cruyff Shield was held on 5 August 2012 at the Amsterdam Arena. The match was played between 2011–12 KNVB Cup winners PSV Eindhoven and the 2011–12 Eredivisie winners Ajax. PSV won the match 4–2 in front of 50,000 fans.

Match

Details

2012
Joh
j
j
Johan Cruyff Shield